Queen's University of Belfast was a university constituency of the Parliament of Northern Ireland from 1921 until 1969. It returned four MPs, using proportional representation by means of the single transferable vote. In 1969 the constituency was abolished under the reforms carried out by the Prime Minister of Northern Ireland Terence O'Neill.

Franchise
The constituency was created by the Government of Ireland Act 1920 and its four MPs were elected by the graduates of Queen's University of Belfast.

Second Dáil
In May 1921, Dáil Éireann, the parliament of the self-declared Irish Republic run by Sinn Féin, passed a resolution declaring that elections to the House of Commons of Northern Ireland and the House of Commons of Southern Ireland would be used as the election for the Second Dáil. All those elected were on the roll of the Second Dáil, but as no Sinn Féin MP was elected for Queen's University, it was not represented there.

Members of Parliament

Election results

Elections in the 1920s

At the 1925 Northern Ireland general election, John Campbell, Robert James Johnstone, Hugh Morrison and John Hanna Robb were elected unopposed.

Elections in the 1930s

At the 1935 Queen's University of Belfast by-election, Arthur Brownlow Mitchell was elected unopposed.

At the 1938 Queen's University of Belfast by-election, Howard Stevenson was elected unopposed.

Elections in the 1940s
At the 1942 Queen's University of Belfast by-election, William Lyle was elected unopposed.

At the 1943 Queen's University of Belfast by-election, John W. Renshaw was elected unopposed.

Elections in the 1950s

Elections in the 1960s

	

At the 1965 Northern Ireland general election, Harold McClure, Elizabeth Maconachie, Sheelagh Murnaghan and Charles Stewart were elected unopposed.

References

Northern Ireland Parliamentary Election Results: University

Northern Ireland Parliament constituencies established in 1921
1969 disestablishments
Constituencies of the Northern Ireland Parliament
Queen's University Belfast
Constituencies of the Northern Ireland Parliament in Belfast
University constituencies in the United Kingdom
Dáil constituencies in Northern Ireland (historic)